Reciprocal length or inverse length is a quantity or measurement used in several branches of science and mathematics. As the reciprocal of length, common units used for this measurement include the reciprocal metre or inverse metre (symbol: m−1), the reciprocal centimetre or inverse centimetre (symbol: cm−1).

Quantities measured in reciprocal length include:
absorption coefficient or attenuation coefficient, in materials science
curvature of a line, in mathematics
gain, in laser physics
magnitude of vectors in reciprocal space, in crystallography
more generally any spatial frequency e.g. in cycles per unit length
optical power of a lens, in optics
rotational constant of a rigid rotor, in quantum mechanics
wavenumber, or magnitude of a wavevector, in spectroscopy
density of a linear feature in hydrology and other fields; see kilometre per square kilometre

In optics, the dioptre is a unit equivalent to reciprocal metre.

Measure of energy
In some branches of physics, the universal constants c, the speed of light, and ħ, the reduced Planck constant, are treated as being unity (i.e. that c = ħ = 1), which leads to mass, energy, momentum, frequency and reciprocal length all having the same unit. As a result, reciprocal length is used as a measure of energy. The frequency of a photon yields a certain photon energy, according to the Planck–Einstein relation, and the frequency of a photon is related to its spatial frequency via the speed of light. Spatial frequency is a reciprocal length, which can thus be used as a measure of energy, usually of a particle. For example, the reciprocal centimetre, is an energy unit equal to the energy of a photon with a wavelength of 1 cm.

The energy is inversely proportional to the size of the unit of which the reciprocal is used, and is proportional to the number of reciprocal length units. For example, in terms of energy, one reciprocal metre equals  (one hundredth) as much as a reciprocal centimetre. Five reciprocal metres are five times as much energy as one reciprocal metre.

See also
 Reciprocal second

Further reading

Length
Physical quantities
SI derived units